Farley Hall may refer to:
 Farley Hall, Swallowfield is an 18th-century grade I listed country house in the English village of Farley Hill
 Farley Hall (University of Notre Dame), a residence hall at University of Notre Dame, South Bend, Indiana, U.S.

See also
 Farley (disambiguation)
 Farley Hill (disambiguation)
 Farnley Hall (disambiguation)